Symphony for Improvisers is an album by American jazz trumpeter Don Cherry, released by Blue Note Records in August 1967. It features Gato Barbieri, Henry Grimes, and Ed Blackwell, all of whom appeared on Cherry's previous album Complete Communion, along with Karl Berger, Jean-François Jenny-Clark, and Pharoah Sanders. Symphony for Improvisers was recorded in 1966. The front cover photograph was taken at New York Public Library for the Performing Arts, Upper West Side, New York City.

The tracks on Symphony for Improvisers were included in the compilation The Complete Blue Note Recordings of Don Cherry. In 2021, the Ezz-thetics label reissued Symphony For Improvisers along with Complete Communion on the compilation Complete Communion & Symphony For Improvisers Revisited.

Reception

The AllMusic review by Steve Huey states: "Even though the album is full of passionate fireworks, there's also a great deal of subtlety — the flavors added to the ensemble by Berger's vibes and Sanders' piccolo, for example, or the way other instrumental voices often support and complement a solo statement. Feverish but well-channeled, this larger-group session is probably Cherry's most gratifying for Blue Note".

Ollie Bivens, writing for All About Jazz, commented: "Symphony for Improvisers is a lesson in controlled chaos that remains eminently musical... This music is cerebral without being cold, freewheeling without degenerating into a lot of blowing for the sake of blowing. Never boring, Symphony for Improvisers is for jazz fans with lengthy attention spans and open ears."

Ekkehard Jost wrote that Symphony for Improvisers and its predecessor Complete Communion are "among the most important LPs Don Cherry made, if not among the most important in free jazz of the Sixties." According to Jost, the central idea is that "monothematic pieces are dropped and several thematic complexes are integrated into a suite whose 'movements,' while clearly identifiable thanks to their contrasted thematic material, are linked with one another." Jost noted that, in relation to Complete Communion, Symphony for Improvisers "is more open in form, despite an almost identical construction. Transitions between the thematic sections are frequently fluid, as are the boundaries between composed material and improvisations. A great deal more time is spent on improvisations, as opposed to the themes, which become more and more fragmentary."

Track listing
All compositions by Don Cherry
 "Symphony for Improvisers: Symphony for Improvisers/Nu Creative Love/What's Not Serious?/Infant Happiness" - 19:43
 "Manhattan Cry: Manhattan Cry/Lunatic/Sparkle Plenty/Om Nu" - 19:17

Personnel
 Don Cherry – cornet
 Gato Barbieri – tenor saxophone
 Pharoah Sanders – tenor saxophone, piccolo
 Karl Berger – vibes, piano
 Henry Grimes – bass
 Jean-François Jenny-Clark – bass
 Ed Blackwell – drums

References

Don Cherry (trumpeter) albums
1966 albums
Blue Note Records albums
Albums recorded at Van Gelder Studio
Albums produced by Alfred Lion